Remi Lescrauwaet (born 6 September 1915, date of death unknown) was a Belgian boxer who competed in the 1936 Summer Olympics. In 1936 he was eliminated in the second round of the featherweight class after losing his fight to the eventual bronze medalist Josef Miner.

External links
 
 Remi Lescrauwaet's profile at Sports Reference.com

1915 births
Year of death missing
Featherweight boxers
Olympic boxers of Belgium
Boxers at the 1936 Summer Olympics
Belgian male boxers